Conrado Adalberto Cabrera Marrero (born 24 April 1967) is a retired male track cyclist from Cuba. Cabrera represented his native country at the 1992 Summer Olympics in Barcelona, Spain. He also claimed two bronze medals at the Pan American Games.

References

1967 births
Living people
Cyclists at the 1987 Pan American Games
Cyclists at the 1991 Pan American Games
Cyclists at the 1992 Summer Olympics
Olympic cyclists of Cuba
Cuban track cyclists
Place of birth missing (living people)
Cuban male cyclists
Pan American Games bronze medalists for Cuba
Pan American Games medalists in cycling
Medalists at the 1987 Pan American Games
Medalists at the 1991 Pan American Games
20th-century Cuban people
21st-century Cuban people